A superpower is a sovereign state able to project its power globally.

Superpower may also refer to:

Fiction

Superpower (ability), extraordinary powers mostly possessed by fictional characters, commonly in American comic books
Project Superpowers, a comic book from Dynamite Entertainment

Games and toys
Superpower (board game), a 1986 political strategy game
SuperPower, a 2002 political simulation computer game
SuperPower 2, a 2004 strategic wargame game
Super PLAY, a video game magazine named Super POWER from 1993 to 1996
Super Powers Collection, a line of action figures based on DC Comics

Geopolitics
Energy superpower, a country that supplies large amounts of energy resources to a significant number of other countries
Potential superpowers, a state or a political and economic entity that is speculated to be—or to have the potential to soon become—a superpower
Second Superpower, the concept of global civil society as a counter to the United States

Music
"Superpower" (song), on Beyoncé's 2013 album Beyoncé
SuperPower, a musician featured on "Lolli Lolli" by Three 6 Mafia
"Super Powers", a song on The Dismemberment Plan's 2001 album Change

Sport
The Super Powers, a tag team in the NWA's Jim Crockett Promotions in the 1980s
Super Cup (rugby union), an annual international Rugby Union competition, originally called Super Powers Cup

Television
The Superpower, a 1983 Hong Kong TV series 
The Legendary Super Powers Show, an alternate title for a later season of Super Friends
"Super Powers" (Homeland), a 2015 episode of the TV series Homeland

Other uses
Superpower (film), a documentary film directed by Sean Penn and Aaron Kaufman, telling the story of Volodymyr Zelensky's rise from comic actor to his presidency in Ukraine, as well as the recent history of Ukraine.
Superpower (horse), a British racehorse
Super Power Building, the Church of Scientology's high-rise complex in Clearwater, Florida
Tetration, in mathematics, repeated exponentiation